Goldie Hexagon Racing was a motor racing team from the United Kingdom, founded by Paul Michaels.

Formula One

Goldie Hexagon Racing first entered a Formula One race in 1972, at the non-Championship World Championship Victory Race. They entered a March 721 for British racing driver John Watson. Watson qualified the car in tenth position and finished the race in sixth position. In  Goldie Hexagon Racing returned to Formula One and raced a full Championship season, again with John Watson, entering Brabham cars. The season started in Argentina, where Watson qualified the car in 20th position and finished 12th. In Brazil Watson qualified in 15th position, but retired on lap 27. He also failed to finish in South Africa. In Spain Watson qualified in 15th position and finished 11th, and he finished in the same position in Belgium. In Monaco Watson scored Goldie Hexagon Racing's first World Championship points, when he finished in sixth position. In Sweden Watson finished in 11th position. In the Netherlands Watson finished 7th. In France Goldie Hexagon Racing entered two cars, one for Watson and one for Carlos Pace. While Watson finished in 16th position, Pace failed to qualify. Two races later, in Austria, Watson finished in fourth position, scoring three World Championship points. In Italy Watson qualified the car in fourth position, his highest of the season, but only finished in seventh place. In the USA, at the last race of the season, Watson finished in fifth position, scoring a further two Championship points. The 1974 United States Grand Prix was the last Formula One race for Goldie Hexagon Racing.

Race results

Complete Formula One World Championship results
(key) (results in bold indicate pole position; results in italics indicate fastest lap)

Formula One Non-Championship results

Complete Shellsport International Series results
(key) (Races in bold indicate pole position; races in italics indicate fastest lap)

References

Formula One entrants
British auto racing teams
Auto racing teams established in 1972
Auto racing teams disestablished in 1977